Crossodactylodes pintoi (common name: brown bromeliad frog) is a species of frog in the family Leptodactylidae.
It is endemic to Rio de Janeiro and Espírito Santo states of southeastern Brazil, although the latter records may represent another species. This little known species is assumed to be associated with bromeliads, similarly as other Crossodactylodes species. It is probably impacted by habitat loss, including that caused by collecting of bromeliads.

References

Crossodactylodes
Endemic fauna of Brazil
Amphibians of Brazil
Taxa named by Doris Mable Cochran
Taxonomy articles created by Polbot
Amphibians described in 1938